Jake Hansen (born August 21, 1989) is an American professional ice hockey forward. He is currently an playing with the Nottingham Panthers in the Elite Ice Hockey League (EIHL).

Playing career
Hansen played junior hockey with the Sioux Falls Stampede in the United States Hockey League. After joined the Stampede mid-year and helping capture the Clark Cup in the 2006–07 season, Hansen was selected 68th overall in the 2007 NHL Entry Draft by the Columbus Blue Jackets.

Hansen attended University of Minnesota where he played NCAA Division I hockey with the Minnesota Golden Gophers of the Western Collegiate Hockey Association (WCHA), registering 36 goals, 41 assists, 77 points, and 155 penalty minutes in 149 games played. In his sophomore year was named to the WCHA All-Academic Team.

On April 12, 2012, the Columbus Blue Jackets of the National Hockey League signed Hansen to a two-year entry-level contract. He spent the next two seasons playing with the Springfield Falcons, the Blue Jackets' American Hockey League (AHL) affiliate.  Following the 2014 season, the Blue Jackets did not give Hansen a qualifying offer, leaving him as an unrestricted free agent.

On August 26, 2014, Hansen left North America and embarked on a European career, as Ässät Pori of the Finnish Liiga announced it had signed Hansen to a two-year contract. Following the conclusion of his two-year tenure in Finland, Hansen opted for a move to Germany, agreeing to a one-year deal with Schwenninger Wild Wings of the Deutsche Eishockey Liga on September 15, 2016. In 46 games during the 2016–17 season, he contributed with 14 points before opting for an early release nearing the completion of the season with the Wild Wings out of playoff contention on February 16, 2017.

Career statistics

Awards and honors

References

External links

1989 births
Living people
Ässät players
American men's ice hockey forwards
Columbus Blue Jackets draft picks
Coventry Blaze players
HKM Zvolen players
Minnesota Golden Gophers men's ice hockey players
Nottingham Panthers players
Schwenninger Wild Wings players
Sioux Falls Stampede players
Springfield Falcons players
American expatriate ice hockey players in Germany
American expatriate ice hockey players in Finland
American expatriate ice hockey players in Denmark
American expatriate ice hockey players in England
American expatriate ice hockey players in Slovakia